Collocalia buday is an extinct species of large swiftlet from the Late Oligocene to Early Miocene of Australia. It was described in 2001 by Walter Boles from fossil material found at Riversleigh, in the Boodjamulla National Park of north-western Queensland.

References

Fossil taxa described in 2001
buday
Oligocene birds
Miocene birds
Oligocene birds of Australia
Riversleigh fauna
Miocene birds of Australia